Jim McCarthy is an author, a keynote speaker, and the co-creator of the Core Protocols with Michele McCarthy. Jim is the author of Software for Your Head and Dynamics of Software Development. He worked at Bell Laboratories, the Whitewater Group, and Microsoft, and holds a key patent on instant messaging.

References 

Year of birth missing (living people)
Living people
American male writers
Microsoft employees